The 2010–11 ASEAN Basketball League Grand Finals Playoffs was the second season of competition since its establishment. A total of four teams competed. The 2010–11 ABL Grand Finals Playoffs started after the 2010–11 ABL Regular Season ended on 15 January 2011 and will conclude on the Finals.

The Chang Thailand Slammers defeated the defending champions AirAsia Philippine Patriots in the Finals 2 games to none to win their first title.

Bracket

Semifinals

Slammers vs. Slingers

Patriots vs. Dragons

Finals

Winners

Statistics

Season leaders

Season highs

Teams
See 2010-11 Asean Basketball League squads.

References

External links
 The official website of the Asean Basketball League

Playoffs
ASEAN Basketball League playoffs